Pixie cup may refer to:

Fungi
 Geopyxis carbonaria, fungus also known as a "pixie cup"
 Geopyxis vulcanalis, fungus commonly known as the "vulcan pixie cup"
 Scutellinia scutellata, fungus also known as the "eyelash pixie cup"

Lichen
A number of species of the lichens Cladonia (cup lichen)
 Cladonia asahinae, lichen commonly known as "pixie cup lichen"

See also
Elf Cup (disambiguation)
Fairy Cup (disambiguation)